The Legislative Assembly of the State of Amapá (Portuguese: Assembleia Legislativa do Amapá) is the legislative body of the government of the state of Amapá in Brazil.

It is composed of 24 state deputies. It is located in Macapá, Amapá.

State legislatures of Brazil
Politics of Amapá
Unicameral legislatures
Amapá